Ali Meziane Ighil (born January 12, 1952) is an Algerian former footballer.

Club career
Ighil spentNA Hussein Dey. He was a member of the NA Hussein Dey team that won the 1979 Algerian Cup and reached the finals of the 1978 African Cup Winners' Cup.

International career
On June 3, 1973, Ighil made his debut for the Algerian National Team as a starter in a friendly against Brazil at the Stade 5 Juillet 1962. Ighil played the entire match as Brazil won 2–0. 

In 1982, Ighil was selected as a member of the Algerian National Team for the 1982 African Cup of Nations in Libya. Ighil participated in just one game, the third place match against Zambia, as Algeria finished fourth.

Managerial career
On July 3, 2010, Ighil was appointed as the coach of ASO Chlef, signing a one-year contract with the club. In his first season with the club, Ighil lead them to the league title for the first time in the club's history.

Honours

Player
 Won the Algerian Cup once with NA Hussein Dey in 1979
 Finalist of the African Cup Winners' Cup once with NA Hussein Dey in 1978

Manager
 Won the Algerian Ligue Professionnelle 1 once with ASO Chlef in 2010–11 Algerian Ligue Professionnelle 1

Personal life
On May 21, 2007, Ighil was sentenced to three years in prison for his role in the Khalifa embezzlement case. On January 1, 2010, he was released from prison.

References

External links
Meziane Ighil at Footballdatabase

1952 births
Living people
Kabyle people
Algerian footballers
Algeria international footballers
1982 African Cup of Nations players
NA Hussein Dey players
Association football defenders
Algerian football managers
NA Hussein Dey managers
Algeria national football team managers
Raja CA managers
ASO Chlef managers
JS Kabylie managers
USM Alger managers
MC Alger managers
DRB Tadjenanet managers
RC Relizane managers
JS Saoura managers
Algerian expatriate football managers
Algerian expatriate sportspeople in Morocco
Expatriate football managers in Morocco
Algerian Ligue Professionnelle 1 managers
Botola managers
Algerian prisoners and detainees
Prisoners and detainees of Algeria
21st-century Algerian people